Tarsis Carvalho Humphreys (born November 4, 1983) is a Brazilian Jiu-Jitsu practitioner. He became a Jiu-Jitsu Black Belt under Fabio Gurgel, the co-founder of the Alliance Jiu Jitsu Team.

Humphreys was born in Sao Paulo, Brazil, and is one of Alliance's heavy hitter Brazilian jiu-jitsu competitors. From 1998 to 2009 he won a medal in whichever Black Belt adult division he entered. He is the 2010 Medium Heavyweight Jiu-Jitsu World Champion and the champion of the inaugural World Professional Jiu-Jitsu Cup, at his weight and at the open division defeating Gracie Barra’s Braulio Estima. He is also a medalist at the last three BJJ World Championships.

Humphreys is a veteran at ADCC. In 2007 he was third place losing at the semi-final in a very tight fight against the UFC and ADCC star Demian Maia (who after that became champion overcoming Flavio "Cachorrao" Almeida).

References

Tarsis Humphrey: ADCC BARCELONA.

External links
Tarsis Interview
 Tarsis Humphreys BJJ (GI) career on MARanking | Martial Arts Ranking

Living people
Brazilian people of English descent
Brazilian practitioners of Brazilian jiu-jitsu
Sportspeople from São Paulo
1983 births
People awarded a black belt in Brazilian jiu-jitsu
21st-century Brazilian people